Damir Burić may refer to:

 Damir Burić (footballer) (born 1964), Croatian football coach and former player
 Damir Burić (water polo) (born 1980), Croatian water polo player